The Detroit Olympics were a minor league hockey team located in Detroit, Michigan that was a member of the Canadian Professional Hockey League 1927-29 and the International Hockey League 1929-36. The team played all of their home games at the Detroit Olympia. On October 4, 1936, after winning the IHL championship, the Olympics moved to Pittsburgh to become the Pittsburgh Hornets.

References

International Hockey League (1929–1936) teams